Roger Federer and Max Mirnyi were the defending champions but only Mirnyi competed that year with Mahesh Bhupathi.

Bhupathi and Mirnyi won in the final 6–3, 7–5 against Wayne Black and Kevin Ullyett.

Seeds

Draw

External links
 2003 Kremlin Cup Men's Doubles Draw

Kremlin Cup
Kremlin Cup